WFBR-LP (95.3 FM) is a radio station licensed to broadcast in Mount Washington, Kentucky, United States.  The station is currently owned by First Baptist Church of Mount Washington.

WFBR first went on the air on November 29, 2003.  The primary coverage area for WFBR includes most of Bullitt County, Kentucky (where it is based).  It can also be tuned in throughout much of southern Jefferson County and western Spencer County.  It has also been reported to be heard in Hardin and other surrounding counties in some areas.  The station initially was on the air at 93.9 FM but was moved to 95.3 FM in late 2008 after a co-channel interference developed with a new nearby station. The station was issued a license for the 95.3 FM frequency on April 2, 2014.

The station carries Contemporary Christian music as the main programming lineup.  The station also airs music from bands and artists local to their area.  High school sports and other local events are also frequently covered on the station.  Local announcements are frequently made throughout the day.

References

External links
 

FBR-LP
Bullitt County, Kentucky
FBR-LP
Baptist Christianity in Kentucky
2003 establishments in Kentucky
Contemporary Christian radio stations in the United States
Radio stations established in 2003